Two Is a Family is a 2016 French comedy-drama film remake of the Mexican film Instructions Not Included (No se Aceptan Devoluciones), directed by Hugo Gélin and starring Omar Sy.

Plot

Samuel (Omar Sy), runner, party-goer and womanizer, lives by the sea in the south of France. Unattached, his life changes the day when Kristin (Clémence Poésy), a former fling, places his three-month-old daughter Gloria in his arms. Unable to take care of her, he embarks on a trip to London, in order to return Gloria to her mother. He loses track of Kristin, does not have a penny in his pocket and does not speak a word of English. Fortunately, he meets Bernie (Antoine Bertrand), a gay Frenchman who works in the film industry and offers him a stunt job.

Over the next eight years, Samuel raises Gloria and works as a stuntman, with Gloria often accompanying him as he still cannot speak English. Samuel creates an imaginary secret agent mother for Gloria, who corresponds with her on the Internet. During a visit to the doctor, it is revealed that treatments are not working, and the audience is led to believe that Samuel has a terminal illness. One day, when Gloria is eight, her real mother shows up from New York with her boyfriend and a new maternal instinct. Samuel is frustrated with Kristin, who eventually asks to take Gloria back to New York with her. Gloria becomes alienated from her father when she overhears him revealing that he fabricated her mother's backstory.

Kristin eventually requests custody of Gloria, and the case is taken to court. Samuel successfully convinces the judge that he has Gloria's best interests at heart, and is awarded custody. However, Kristin then requests a DNA test, which reveals that Samuel is not Gloria's biological father. While losing custody, Samuel escapes with Gloria to his former job in France. While searching for them, Bernie confronts Kristin and reveals that Gloria, in fact, is terminally ill and could die at any time. Bernie and Kristin eventually find them on the beach, where Kristin drops her custody attempts and all four reunite as a family. The film ends with Samuel sitting alone on the beach, implying that Gloria has passed away.

Cast 
 Omar Sy as Samuel  
 Gloria Colston as Gloria
 Clémence Poésy as Kristin Stuart
 Antoine Bertrand as Bernie
 Ashley Walters as Lowell
 Clémentine Célarié as Samantha
 Ruben Alves had a minor role.

Production 
The film was based on the 2012 Mexico comedy-drama film Instructions Not Included. It began principal photography on 21 September 2015 in Southern France before moving to London. Filming was scheduled to conclude on 10 December 2015.

Reception
On Rotten Tomatoes, the film has an approval rating of 38%.

References

External links 
 
 

2016 films
2016 comedy-drama films
2010s French-language films
French comedy-drama films
Films directed by Hugo Gélin
Films scored by Rob Simonsen
Films shot in London
French LGBT-related films
Remakes of Mexican films
Films about stunt performers
2010s French films